Abimbola Oshin  (born 24 July 1971) is an actress, writer, producer, and businesswoman from Nigeria.

Early life
Oshin was born on 24 July 1971 in Ondo State southwestern Nigeria. She is one of Pa Olasanmi Theophilus Oshin's eight children, the second to last. Oshin attended the University of Lagos where she obtained a Bachelor of Arts (B.A.) degree in Philosophy. Oshin commenced her acting career in 1996 but rose to recognition after starring in a 2012 Yoruba film titled Omo Elemosho.

Oshin grew up in Ondo State where she attended her primary school education at Saint Anne's Primary School. Later, she went to Staff Primary School in Ifẹ, Osun State. For her secondary education, she attended Girls Academy, Sandgrouse in Lagos State. Oshin then went for higher education at the University of Lagos, where she earned a Bachelor of Arts (B.A) degree in Philosophy.

Career

Oshin's love for acting began at a tender age. She has been doing some minor drama in the house with her elder sibling in which they recorded their pseudo videos. But her career in acting started initially during her undergraduate days at the University of Lagos. Her friend's sister introduced her to a group called Ara Osan group. She told her she had joined and she should follow her too.
Oshin agreed, joined the group (Ara Osan) in 1996 and started going for rehearsals. Ara Osan theatre group is a group owned by Rasaq Ajao and she spent four years under her boss. Although she started a movie career with English soap operas but right now, she is into the Yoruba movie industry doing well. The first movie that was released which made her popular was titled Akobi in 1997.

Selected filmography
Eji Owuro (2003)
Omo Elemosho (2012)
Kakanfo (2020)
The New Patriots (2020)

Award and recognitions
In 2016, she was honoured with an Icon Category Award at the 2016 Afro-Heritage Broadcasting and Entertainment and Awards.

See also
 List of Nigerian film producers

References

External links

Living people
People from Ondo City
Nigerian film producers
1971 births
Yoruba actresses
Actresses in Yoruba cinema
University of Lagos alumni
20th-century Nigerian actresses
21st-century Nigerian actresses
Actresses from Ondo State
Yoruba filmmakers
People from Ondo State
Nigerian businesspeople